Pallavi is the thematic line of a song in Carnatic music.

Pallavi may also refer to:

Films 
 Pallavi (1976 film), an Indian Kannada film
 Pallavi (1977 film), an Indian Malayalam film

Other 
 Pallavi (given name)
 Pallavi (actress) (born 1965), Indian actress
 Ragam Thanam Pallavi, a form of singing in Carnatic music
Pallavi Model School, a group of English medium co-educational schools in Hyderabad, India